Vernydub is a surname. Notable people with the surname include:

Vitaliy Vernydub (born 1987), Ukrainian footballer, son of Yuriy
Yuriy Vernydub (born 1966), Ukrainian footballer and manager